The 1921 Big Ten Conference Men's Golf Championship was held in 1921 at Indian Hills. The team champion was Drake with a score of 684. It was also the first year of 36-hole medal play with the top four individual scores from each school counting towards the championship.

Team results

References

Big Ten Conference men's golf
Big Ten Conference Men's Golf Championship